In linguistics exhaustivity refers to an implicature in which a proposition is strengthened by denying its stronger alternatives.  It is a major topic in the linguistic subfields of semantics and pragmatics.

The foundational basis of exhaustivity is Gricean informal pragmatics, specifically scalar implicatures in which a existential quantifier like some is strengthened by denying its stronger alternative (e.g. all).  Much of the work in the area of exhaustivity can be characterized as giving a formal semantic account of contexts where elements in language are interpreted exhaustively, including focus, disjunction, questions, free choice phenomena, and polarity items.

See also
 Alternative semantics
 Focus
 Paul Grice

References

Bibliography
 

 

 
 
 

Linguistics terminology
Semantics